This is a list of broadcast television stations serving Washington, D.C. in the District of Columbia, the Capital Beltway, and Northern Virginia (see also: List of television stations in Virginia, List of television stations in Maryland).

Full-power stations
VC refers to the station's PSIP virtual channel. RF refers to the station's physical RF channel.

LPTV stations

See also
 Media in Washington, D.C.
 NBC Sports Washington
 MASN
 List of television stations in North America by media market

References

Bibliography

External links
 Maryland, DC, Delaware Broadcasters Association

Television stations
Washington, D.C.